The Abarth 1000 GT Coupé or Alfa Romeo 1000 Abarth GT Bertone Coupé is a prototype car made by the Italian car producer Abarth in collaboration with Alfa Romeo, and designed by Franco Scaglione for Bertone. Three cars were built; one example survives, rebodied by Luigi Colani.

Overview
The engine was a short-stroke version of the Alfa Romeo Giulietta's 1.3 litre engine, developed so as to enable it to compete in racing categories restricted to engines of less than one litre. The stroke was reduced to  while the bore remained . The modest engine was offset by the kerb weight of just .

Only three were built, and after at least two of them were crashed while testing at AVUS in Germany the project was abandoned.

Rebodied by Colani
Young designer Luigi Colani bought the wrecked cars and pieced together a fibreglass-bodied design of his own, which still exists although it is currently powered by a 1.3 litre Giulietta Veloce engine.

References

Abarth vehicles
Alfa Romeo concept vehicles
Cars introduced in 1958
Rear-wheel-drive vehicles
Sports cars
Coupés